

The Aquaflight Aqua I, also known as the W-6 was a 6-seat amphibious aircraft developed in the United States shortly after World War II.

Variants
W-6
the initial prototype powered by 2 x  Lycoming O-290 4-cylinder horizontally opposed piston engines
Aqua I
alternative designation of the W-6
W-6A
A second version powered by 2 x  Lycoming O-360 6-cylinder horizontally opposed piston engines
Aqua II
Alternative designation of the W-6A

Specifications

See also

References

 
 
 aerofiles.com
 luftfahrt-archiv.de

Aquaflight aircraft
1940s United States civil utility aircraft
Amphibious aircraft
High-wing aircraft
Aircraft first flown in 1946
Flying boats
Twin piston-engined tractor aircraft